Black Science Orchestra was a musical project headed chiefly by the British DJ and producer Ashley Beedle, which produced a number of disco and rare groove-inspired house records in the 1990s.

History
Enlisting the help of Rob Mello and John Howard, Black Science Orchestra made their debut in 1992 with "Where Were You", a reworking of the classic Trammps tune "Where Were You (When the Lights Went Out?)". The record was given exposure by Frankie Knuckles, and their subsequent releases found favour with both Knuckles and the Masters at Work team over the course of 1992 and 1993.Legal disputes, however, delayed the release of the debut Black Science Orchestra album, and when it finally appeared in 1996 it was with a revised line-up of Beedle, Marc Woolford & Uschi Classen.

Discography

Albums
Walters Room (Junior Boy's Own) 1996

Singles
"Where Were You?" (Junior Boy's Own) 1992
"Strong" (Junior Boy's Own) 1993
"Brand New"/"New Jersey Deep" (FFRR) 1994
The Altered States EP (Junior Boy's Own) 1994
"City of Brotherly Love" (Junior Boy's Own) 1990
"Save U" (Junior Boy's Own) 1996
"Soul Power Music" (Afro Art) 2000

See also
Ashley Beedle
X-Press 2
Ballistic Brothers
Black Jazz Chronicles
Junior Boy's Own

References

English dance music groups
English electronic music groups
Remixers